Caloptilia minimella is a moth of the family Gracillariidae. It is known from Connecticut, Illinois and Maine in the United States.

The larvae feed on Gymnanthes lucida. They mine the leaves of their host plant.

References

minimella
Moths of North America
Moths described in 1915